Seyyedli may refer to:
 Seyyedli (38°24′ N 47°13′ E), Ahar